The Eritrean passport is issued to citizens of Eritrea for international travel. Citizens are not issued passports prior to completion of military service. Eritreans living abroad only receive a passport from their consulate if they have paid their taxes to their country (Eritrea and the United States are the two only countries worldwide to use a citizenship-based taxation). The passport validity is 5 years or less. Eritreans wanting to take another citizenship require permission from the Eritrean Government if they do not want to lose Eritrean citizenship.

As of 1 January 2017, Eritrean citizens had visa-free or visa on arrival access to 35 countries and territories, ranking the Eritrean passport 98th in terms of travel freedom (tied with Yemeni passport) according to the Henley visa restrictions index.

See also
Visa requirements for Eritrean citizens
List of passports

References

 http://www.ericon.org.au/main/page_consular_services_new_eritrean_passport.html

Eritrea
Politics of Eritrea